"There's Something About Harry" is the tenth episode of the second season and twenty-second overall episode of the American television drama series Dexter, which first aired on 2 December 2007 on Showtime in the United States. The episode was written by Scott Reynolds and was directed by Steve Shill.

Title
The title is a play on the 1998 film There's Something About Mary, referring to revelations about Dexter Morgan's adoptive father Harry.

Plot

After their latest confrontation, Dexter imprisons his nemesis James Doakes in a cabin hidden in the Florida Everglades, but is unsure of what to do next. Doakes reveals information that leads Dexter to a surprising discovery about his foster father's death. The FBI continues the search for Doakes, while Miami Metro Lieutenant Maria LaGuerta tries to prove his innocence. As the investigation comes to a close, Dexter's foster sister Debra realizes that her lover, Frank Lundy, will leave Miami at the end of the investigation, and confronts him about the future of their relationship. Dexter and his girlfriend Rita Bennett reconcile and visit the beach together, while Dexter's unhinged lover Lila Tournay plans to frame Dexter's friend and coworker Angel Batista for raping her.

Production
Filming locations for the episode included Palos Verdes Estates, Long Beach, Marina del Rey, and two neighborhoods in Los Angeles, California (Playa del Rey and Venice).

Reception

The episode was positively received. IGN's Eric Goldman gave the episode a rating of 8.5 out of 10, and commented that "[w]hen you raise the stakes as much as last week's Dexter did, it's difficult maintaining momentum. So it was with the latest episode, which calmed down a bit (but only a bit), but clearly was laying groundwork for the huge confrontations coming in the final two episodes." The A.V. Club critic Scott Tobias gave the episode an A grade and stated that "the twist [in the episode] hit like the proverbial ton of bricks, one of those delicious turns that’s both out of the blue and perfectly in keeping with the spirit of the show. What’s more, it’s all about character. A lesser show would be feeding the beast at this juncture, i.e. tying things up as a serialized thriller is supposed to do and hopefully springing a few surprises along the way. But Dexter has never been some run-of-the-mill policier, and the writers have stepped up their game this season."

References

External links

 
 "There's Something About Harry" at Showtime's website

2007 American television episodes
Dexter (TV series) episodes